For Hero: For Fool is the second studio album by American hip hop sextet Subtle. It was released on Lex Records in 2006. "The Mercury Craze" was released as a single from the album.

Critical reception
At Metacritic, which assigns a weighted average score out of 100 to reviews from mainstream critics, the album received an average score of 85% based on 14 reviews, indicating "universal acclaim".

Marisa Brown of AllMusic gave the album 4 stars out of 5, describing it as "a complex, innovative, sometimes bizarre, and usually utterly confusing journey into the minds of lyricist Doseone and his five bandmates." Neal Hayes of PopMatters gave the album 7 stars out of 10, saying, "the Oakland-based group presents a futuristic musical vision that is vivid, unsettling, and, above all, distinctive."

OC Weekly included it on the "Album Covers of the Year" list.

Track listing

Personnel
Credits adapted from liner notes.

Subtle
 Dax Pierson – vocals, harmonica
 Alexander Kort – electric cello, acoustic cello, electric bass, acoustic bass
 Jordan Dalrymple – drums, guitar, synthesizer, vocals
 Jeffrey "Jel" Logan – drum machine
 Marty Kalani Dowers – woodwinds, synthesizer
 Adam "Doseone" Drucker – words, vocals, treatment, artwork

Technical personnel
 Subtle – recording
 Tony Espinoza – mixing

References

External links
 

2006 albums
Subtle (band) albums
Lex Records albums